William Grant (26 April 1891 – 8 August 1955) was an Irish Gaelic footballer. His championship career at senior level with the Tipperary county team spanned eleven years from 1915 to 1926.

Grant made his debut on the inter-county scene at the age of twenty-four when he was selected for the Tipperary senior team. He made his debut during the 1915 championship. The highlight of his inter-county career came in 1920 when he won an All-Ireland medal. Grant also won three Munster medals.

Honours
Templemore-Castleiney
Tipperary Senior Football Championship (1): 1925

Tipperary
All-Ireland Senior Football Championship (1): 1920
Munster Senior Football Championship (3): 1918, 1920, 1922,

References

1891 births
1955 deaths
Tailors
Tipperary inter-county Gaelic footballers
Winners of one All-Ireland medal (Gaelic football)